Vieska is the name of two municipalities in Slovakia:

Vieska, Dunajská Streda District
Vieska, Veľký Krtíš District

See also
 Alavieska, or Lower Vieska
 Ylivieska, or Upper Vieska